Vitória Futebol Clube is a Portuguese sports club from Setúbal, popularly known as Vitória de Setúbal.

League and Cup history 
With the 2007–08 season, Vitória completed 60 presences at the top level of Portuguese football.

European performance 
Despite never winning or reaching a final in the UEFA Cup, in a span of six years (between 1967 and 1973) Vitória was four times quarter-finalist, having defeated such teams as Liverpool, Fiorentina, Anderlecht, Internazionale and Leeds United.

European seasons

References

 
Vitória de Setúbal